Two Japanese warships have borne the name Sokuten:

 , a  launched in 1913 and stricken in 1936
 , a  launched in 1938 and sunk in 1944

Imperial Japanese Navy ship names
Japanese Navy ship names